The Gibson Chet Atkins CE/CEC was a classical-electric guitar manufactured by Gibson and released in 1982. Developed with guitarist Chet Atkins and Kentucky luthier Hascal Haile, the Chet Atkins CEC (Cutaway Electric Classical) merged solid-body electric guitar with classical guitar, resulting in a nylon-string instrument that could be played at high volumes in large auditoriums without feedback.

The instrument featured a 25½ inch scale length and was produced in two neck widths, the CE (1 7/8 inch) and the CEC (2 inches, the standard for most classical guitars). The body featured sound chambers to reduce weight while the top was solid spruce or ceder. The Chet Atkins CEC had a mahogany neck while its pick up system consisted of six individual pieces installed under the bridge. Volume and tone controls were located on the rim.

Classical guitarists have given the innovation little credence, but pop and rock music stars like Sting, Earl Klugh, Zappacosta, David Gilmour, Jack Johnson, Gipsy Kings, Mark Knopfler, Gustavo Cerati, have played it to millions of concert-goers. Gibson also manufactured a model called the Chet Atkins CE which had a smaller 1-7/8" nut width.

The guitar was marketed in black, natural, white, and red wine colors. Gibson discontinued the CEC on January 1, 2006.

The Chet Atkins family had also a steel-string acoustic version released in 1987, the "Chet Atkins SST".

References

Electric guitars